Trends in Urology and Men's Health is a peer-reviewed academic journal of urology and men's health, aimed at urologists, HIV consultants, hospital doctors, selected GPs and specialist nurses, covering subjects that particularly affect men, including cardiovascular disease, urological, sexual and mental health issues. Its editor-in-chief is Roger Kirby, editor is Mike Kirby, and US editor is Culley Carson. It is published six times a year by Wiley.

References 

Urology journals
Wiley (publisher) academic journals
Publications established in 2010
Bimonthly journals